Carya cordiformis, the bitternut hickory, also called bitternut or swamp hickory, is a large pecan hickory with commercial stands located mostly north of the other pecan hickories. Bitternut hickory is cut and sold in mixture with the true hickories. It is the shortest-lived of the hickories, living to about 200 years.

Description 

The flowers are small wind-pollinated catkins, produced in spring. Another identifying characteristic is its bright sulfur-yellow winter bud.

It is closely related to the pecan, sharing similar leaf shape and being classified in the same section of the genus Carya sect. Apocarya, but unlike the pecan, it does not have edible nuts. It is most readily distinguished from the pecan by the smaller number of leaflets, with many leaves having only 7 leaflets (rarely fewer than 9, and often 11–13, in the pecan). Hybrids with the pecan are known, and named Carya × brownii. A hybrid between the shagbark hickory (C. ovata) is also recognized, and is known as Laney's hickory (Carya ×laneyi).

Habitat 
Bitternut hickory grows in moist mountain valleys along streambanks and in swamps. Although it is usually found on wet bottom lands, it grows on dry sites and also grows well on poor soils low in nutrients. The species is not included as a titled species in the Society of American Foresters forest cover types because it does not grow in sufficient numbers.

Range 
Bitternut hickory grows throughout the eastern United States from southwestern New Hampshire, Vermont, Maine, and southern Quebec; west to southern Ontario, central Michigan, and northern Minnesota; south to eastern Texas; and east to northwestern Florida and Georgia. It is most common, however, from southern New England west to Iowa and from southern Michigan south to Kentucky. It is probably the most abundant and most uniformly distributed of all the hickories.

Uses 
Bitternut is used for lumber and pulpwood. Because bitternut hickory wood is hard and durable, it is used for furniture, paneling, dowels, tool handles and ladders. Like other hickories, the wood is used for smoking meat, and by Native Americans for making bows. Bitternut hickory seeds are eaten by rabbits, and both its seeds and bark are eaten by other wildlife.

Genetics
Bitternut hickory is a diploid species with two sets of sixteen chromosomes that readily hybridizes with other diploid hickory species with a few named hican varieties available. The pecan variety 'Major' has bitternut alleles at two simple sequence repeat loci indicating a cryptic cross that may also have involved C. ovata.

Gallery

References

External links 
Carya cordiformis images at the Arnold Arboretum of Harvard University Plant Image Database
Enzenbacher, Tiffany. "Plant Collecting in the Wisconsin Wilds - Part 2." Arnold Arboretum of Harvard University website, 6 September 2017. Accessed 21 May 2020.
"Roads, winter, Valley Road, hickories, 1900." Library Featured Images, Arnold Arboretum of Harvard University website, 5 February, 2019. Accessed 21 May 2020.

 
 Carya cordiformis images at bioimages.vanderbilt.edu*

cordiformis
Trees of Eastern Canada
Trees of the Eastern United States
Hardwood forest plants
Trees of the North-Central United States
Trees of the Southeastern United States
Trees of Ontario
Trees of the Northeastern United States
Trees of the Great Lakes region (North America)
Trees of the South-Central United States
Plants described in 1869